Ekaterina Vladimirovna Kurbatova (born October 7, 1992) is a Russian gymnast.

Career 

Kurbatova competed in the 2009 Glasgow Grand Prix in May winning vault and placing 3rd on the uneven bars.

She also went to the world championships that year in London where she qualified for the all-around and placed 9th on uneven bars behind Italy's Serena Lichetta.
In the all-around competition she fell on balance beam taking her out of the medals.

In 2010, Kurbatova competed at the European Championships where she won the gold medal with her team and on vault. At the 2010 Moscow World Cup, she made both vault and floor finals, and finished on 4th and 1st respectively.
She was also part of the 2010 World Championship team and was mostly taken along due to her vaulting, when it became clear that the Russian team was in desperate need for a third vaulter in team finals. The team went on to become the first Russian gymnastics team ever to win a team gold medal in a World Championship or Olympic Games.

Kurbatova is remarkable for her unique style: a "kick-in" on vault with sometimes questionable leg form, interesting choreography on floor exercise and a compact and efficient composition on the uneven bars (once having performed a very complex combination of Pak salto into a Khorkina II transition) where she is one of the very few Russian gymnasts ever having performed a one-armed pirouette which is more typical for the Chinese style on the uneven bars.

Competitive history

References

External links

1992 births
Living people
Russian female artistic gymnasts
Medalists at the World Artistic Gymnastics Championships
European champions in gymnastics
Gymnasts from Moscow
21st-century Russian women